Vasilios Gordeziani (born 29 January 2002) is a Greek professional footballer of Georgian descent who plays as a forward for Super League club PAOK.

Career

Early career

Vasilis Gordeziani has been with PAOK since 2014 and every year he has improved dramatically. He is an attacker, who can also play equally well on both wings. He is a strong and impetuous player with impressive physical characteristics, who fights exceptionally with his back to goal. He also has a keen eye for goal, producing very good statistics and assists. He was a title-winner with the Under-15s and of course with the Under-19s.

References

2002 births
Living people
Greek footballers
Super League Greece 2 players
PAOK FC players
Association football forwards
Greek people of Georgian descent
Footballers from Thessaloniki
PAOK FC B players